Sadr City, formerly known as Al-Thawra and Saddam City, is a suburb district of the city of Baghdad, Iraq. It was built in 1959 by Prime Minister Abdul Karim Qassim and later unofficially renamed Sadr City after Ayatollah Mohammad Mohammad Sadeq al-Sadr.

Sadr City – or more accurately Thawra District – is one of nine administrative districts in Baghdad. A public housing project neglected by Saddam Hussein, Sadr City holds around 1 million residents.

History

Sadr City was built in Iraq in 1959 by Prime Minister Abdul Karim Qassim in response to grave housing shortages in Baghdad. At the time named Revolution City, it provided housing for Baghdad's urban poor, many of whom had come from the countryside and who had until then lived in appalling conditions. Naziha al-Dulaimi was instrumental in turning the vast slums of eastern Baghdad into a massive public works and housing project that came to be known as Revolution City. It quickly became a stronghold of the Iraqi Communist Party, with resistance to the Baathist-led coup of 1963 becoming prevalent within the city itself. The development was devised by the Greek planner Constantinos Apostolou Doxiadis, who also designed Islamabad and Riyadh.

In 1982, the district was renamed Saddam City. In the 1980s, the district became known for poverty and communist organizing, with illegal documents and, in some cases, people themselves being hidden from the authorities in overflowing septic tanks. The proliferation of communism in the district was seen by some as ironic, given how Doxiadis's design had been considered "anticommunist" with the view that it promoted a village atmosphere in an effort to ease the transition of rural migrants to the city.

After the Saddam Hussein was removed from power in April 2003, the district was unofficially renamed Sadr City after deceased shiite leader Mohammad Mohammad Sadeq al-Sadr.

2003

In April, 2003, the US Army 2d Squadron, 2nd Armored Cavalry Regiment established their headquarters at the abandoned Sumer cigarette factory located on the eastern side of Sadr City. In honor of the history of the factory, the military named their new camp Camp Marlboro. 

During the fall and winter of 2003, American forces focused on rebuilding civilian infrastructure and training local leaders in democracy. District and neighborhood councils were established, giving the residents of Sadr City representation in the new Iraqi government. The municipal building became the centerpiece of the reconstruction effort, and it was the site of a forward outpost of American soldiers that met daily with council members and citizens. Progress was slow due to escalating tensions and violence, and attacks against the American military increased significantly in late 2003.

On October 9, 2003, the Mahdi Army in Sadr City ambushed an American convoy, inflicting multiple casualties. The Combat Patrol, made up of vehicles from the 2/2 ACR was attacked by approximately 100 men with several improvised explosive devices, RPGs and automatic weapons fire from the surrounding rooftops and streets killing and injuring soldiers from E Trp 2/2 ACR. The Mahdi Army attempted to capture several soldiers during the ambush, but they were ultimately unsuccessful in their efforts to obtain hostages.

On November 9, 2003, a violent confrontation erupted between the chairman of the District Council, elements of the 2d ACR, and a team from the 490th Civil Affairs Battalion. The chairman refused to surrender a pistol during security screening and was shot by an American soldier during a shoving match. The death of the chairman caused a serious setback to reconstruction efforts and led to increased violence.

2004

Throughout March 2004 through July 2004, FOB IronHorse, in Sadr City, elements of the 1st Brigade Combat Team and the 13th Signal Battalion were hit almost daily with Mortars and RPGs. TF Lancer was located at FOB War Eagle, northern side of Sadr City. There was no American media in the area to report the multiple mortar and RPG fire which hit both FOBs almost daily.

In late March, 2004, Task Force Lancer, under the command of Lieutenant Colonel Gary Volesky arrived at Camp War Eagle on the north-east corner of Sadr City, to assume responsibility for the governance and security of Sadr City. Task Force Lancer consisted primarily of the 2nd Battalion, 5th Cavalry Regiment from the 1st Brigade, 1st Cavalry Division under the command of Colonel Robert B. Abrams.

On April 4, 2004 the Mahdi Army ambushed a U.S. Army patrol in Sadr City, killing eight American soldiers, and wounding 57 more. This sparked fierce urban fighting between the Mahdi Army and newly arrived soldiers of the B Company 20th Engineer Battalion 2–5, C Battery 1-82 Field Artillery, 2-8 and 1-12 CAV of the 1st Cavalry Division (1CD); alongside the just-relieved 1st Squadron, 2d Armored Cavalry Regiment and elements from 2-37 AR of the 1st Armored Division.

In late 2004 the Mahdi Army enacted a cease-fire with U.S. troops, and offered to help repair and rebuild the city's main infrastructure which was leaving millions without electricity, water or sewage. On October 10, Camp Marlboro was hit by three mortars launched from within the city, which saw the U.S. beef up security and attach an additional 28 tanks and 14 Bradley Fighting Vehicles to the camp. The following day, on October 11, the Weapons Handover Program began in the city, which was designed to purchase weapons from militants.

2005
On May 15, 2005 the bodies of 13 Iraqis were discovered in a shallow grave, each blindfolded, tied and shot multiple times in the back of the head. They had been hastily buried in a vacant lot. On May 18, gunmen shot and killed Ali Mutib Sakr, a Transport Ministry driver. On May 23, a car bomb exploded outside a crowded restaurant, killing eight Iraqis and wounding an additional 89. On March 12 three car bombs exploded, killing thirty-five people. On July 1 a car bomb exploded in an open-air market killing 77 and wounding 96.

In August 2005 the Iraqi government and the U.S. Army locked down Sadr City for three days to search houses for hostages and death squads. Some hostages were found and freed. Multiple death squad leaders were arrested. In these three days, the number of murders in Baghdad reached the lowest level ever compared to the average of the previous months of the U.S.-led war.

2006
On October 24, 2006, the U.S. Army locked down Sadr City while searching for a kidnapped U.S. soldier. During the lock down, deaths dropped by 50%. When Prime Minister al-Maliki demanded the end of the blockade, the murder rate returned to previous levels.

On November 23, 2006, a series of car bombs exploded, followed by mortar attacks, which killed at least 215 people. See 23 November 2006 Sadr City bombings for further details.

2007 Surge 
As the U.S. began a surge of forces into Iraq, Operation Imposing Law was implemented in Sadr City. On station US army units included 82nd Airborne DIV 2/325 INF White Falcons and 2nd INF DIV C- CO 2/3 INF SBCT.

2008 fighting 

In March 2008, during the Battle of Basra, clashes erupted in Sadr City between U.S. forces and the Mahdi Army. At that time, Sadr City was secured with the use of Strykers from the 1st Squadron, 2d Stryker Cavalry Regiment led by LTC Daniel Barnett. The fighting grew so intense that armored vehicles including M2A3 Bradley IFVs and M1A1/2 Abrams MBTs were called in for assistance. The Mahdi Army relied heavily in the use of improvised explosive devices allegedly smuggled from Iran and engaged U.S. forces with sniper fire and intense small arms engagements in the heavily congested urban area. The U.S. launched at least one air strike, killing 10 reported militants. As of March 29, 2008, about 75 Iraqis have been killed and 500 injured. The Iraq Health Ministry claims these are all civilians, but the U.S. disputes this.

The Mahdi Army intensified rocket attacks on the Green Zone and other U.S. bases, killing at least three American soldiers and several civilians. On April 6 Iraqi and U.S. forces moved into the southern third of Sadr City to prevent rocket and mortar fire being launched from the area. 1st Squadron, 2nd Stryker Cavalry Regiment then took control of southern Sadr City and hosted Charlie Company, 1-64 Armor, Bravo Company, 1-14 Infantry and Delta Company, 4-64 Armor along with U.S. combat engineers from the 3rd Brigade Heavy Combat Team, 4th Infantry Division. 3rd Brigade, 4th Infantry Division, the headquarters brigade for the operation, began construction of a concrete barrier along Al-Quds street to seal the southern third of the city off and allow reconstruction to take place. C/1-68, a tank and mechanized infantry company team under command and control of 1-68 Armor Combined Arms Battalion, and D/4-64, a tank and mechanized infantry company team, attached to 1-2 SCR, were the primary wall build company level organizations. On May 1, 2008, D/4-64 and B/1-14 killed 28 Mahdi Fighters just north of the concrete barrier. Over the next month, the Mahdi Army launched a number of attacks on the troops building the barrier, but sustained heavy losses. On May 3, 2008 soldiers from Charlie Company, 2-30 Infantry, 10th Mountain Division placed additional barriers along the eastern boundary of Sadr City to isolate the militants' stronghold, but met heavy resistance as Mahdi Fighters attacked the soldiers with RPGs, IEDs, and small arms fire. The Mahdi fighters were able to destroy two HMMWVs and two MRAPs, however, the unit responded with combined air and ground strikes and used tanks, attack helicopters, and heavy weapons to repel the assault while claiming the deaths of nearly 30 militants.

On May 10, a ceasefire was ordered by Muqtada Al-Sadr, allowing Iraqi troops into all of Sadr City. On May 20, in an entirely Iraqi-planned and executed operation, six battalions of Iraqi troops, including troops from the 1st (Quick Reaction Force) division stationed in Al-Anbar and armored forces from the 9th Division based in Taji, operating without the involvement of U.S. ground forces, (except Marines from 1st ANGLICO, SALT B Provided over watch) pushed deep into Sadr City. The Iraqi Security Forces met little resistance in moving through Sadr City and took up positions formerly occupied by the Mahdi Army, including the Imam Ali and Al-Sadr hospitals and Al-Sadr's political office. Sadr City then became the main base for Shi'a Insurgent group Kata'ib Hezbollah, an offshoot of the Mahdi Army.

2009
After a year of relative calm, Sadr City was struck by a massive bomb blast on June 24, 2009 when a bomb-laden vegetable cart or motorcycle was detonated in the Muraidi Market of the town, killing at least 69 civilians and wounding over 150.

Voters in Sadr City allowed the Iraqi National Alliance to make huge gains in provincial elections in 2009 and parliamentary elections in 2010.

Reconstruction efforts
In 2010, a Turkish consortium of contractors won the bid for the reconstruction of Baghdad's Sadr City, offering to complete the massive project for $11.3 billion. The project involves construction of a modern city of 75,000 housing units to accommodate up to 600,000 people.

See also

 2015 Baghdad market truck bomb
 List of places in Iraq
 List of neighborhoods and districts in Baghdad

References

External links
 Shiites take over Baghdad district—an Associated Press article on Saddam City in The Globe and Mail
 Sadr City on GlobalSecurity.org
 Sadr City Psychosocial Report (May 23, 2008; PDF) by the International Medical Corps and UNICEF

 
1959 establishments in Iraq
Administrative districts in Baghdad
Populated places established in 1959